Yarri (c. 1810 – 24 July 1880) also spelled "Yarrie", "Yarry" or "Yarra" was an Australian Aboriginal man of the Wiradjuri language group who took a major part in the rescue of 69 people from the flooded Murrumbidgee River in Gundagai over three days, from the night of  25 June to 27 June 1852.

Background
Yarri came from Brungle in the Gundagai Police District, His native name of Coonong Denamundinna indicates he was of the Rainbow serpent pastoral property near Tumblong, Adelong N.S.W. which was also associated with the Coonong region downstream of Wagga Wagga in New South Wales. Yarri worked at Nangus station as a shepherd. The aboriginals of the area were numerous: according to an 1851 estimate, which classified them generically as belonging to the Tumut tribe, they consisted of 35 groups.

Life
Yarri is said to have previously saved the life of John Hargreaves at the time of the 1844 flooding in the area. His act earned him the friendship of the family and he lived on their property at Tarrabandra until his death. A number of stories circulate suggesting that Yarri is the same as the native of that name mentioned as being responsible for the death of John Baxter at Caiguna in Western Australia during the expedition made by Edward John Eyre in 1841. This identification would place Yarri a long way from his traditional lands. The association of the two goes back to newspaper reports at the time. In the same year as the flood, the Brungle aboriginal community is said to have blamed him for the death of a part Aboriginal woman, Sally McLeod, much closer to his home area, near Gundagai in 1852.  Warrants were made for his arrest. Yarri's wife was known by the name of Black Sally, and that Sally is said to have died on walkabout in March 1873.

24-25 June 1852
The Murrumbidgee, whose name is said to derive from an Wiradjuri word morunbeedja, warning of 'big water', had inundated the area on several occasions in the past, in 1844, and August 1851. Old Aboriginals had cautioned people building in the district of its dangers, recounting that in earlier times, water had risen so high that it covered the tops of large gum trees. In the flood at Gundagai, New South Wales on 25 June 1852, 48 houses in North Gundagai were washed away and the overflow killed a large number of local white people, with estimates varying from 81 to almost 100, out of the town's population of 397, of whom 49 were rescued by aboriginals. The event itself became one of the largest natural disasters in Australia's history. Local Aboriginal men, Yarri and Jacky Jacky between them were credited with having saved approximately 28 people, though contemporary reports assert that Jackey was responsible for some 20 of these. The difference between the two may stem from the fact that Jackey had the use of a boat, capable of holding 8 people, whereas Yarri's rescue efforts were conducted with a frail native bark canoe that could only carry two. Others were rescued by Long Jimmy and Tommy Davis.

Recognition
Though poems and stories were published at the time celebrating the heroic efforts of the aborigines in rescuing whites, public recognition in terms of a material reward was slow in coming. It was only in 1875, by which time Jackey had died, that it was announced that the native rescuers were entitled to collect sixpence from settlers.
Yarri, Jacky Jacky and Tommy Davis were honoured with bronze breastplates for their efforts, and were allowed to demand sixpences from all Gundagai residents, although Yarri was maltreated on at least one occasion after the flood.    Long Jimmy died not long after his rescues, possibly from the effects of being exposed to the freezing cold and wet conditions. The rescue effort and reward to Tommy Davis are recorded in an old Gundagai Independent newspaper.

A nulla-nulla and shield believed to belong to Yarri, was presented to the Gundagai Historical Society by John Hargreaves' grandson Dallas.

Yarri suffered from an aneurism, but refused to be transported to Sydney for treatment, and crept out of the hospital in April to return to his dwelling, preferring to die in the area he belonged to at Gundagai. He subsequently died on 24 July 1880 and is buried in the Catholic Section of the North Gundagai General Cemetery.

Memorials
There are several tributes to Yarri in the Gundagai area including a town memorial, sundial, marble plaque and black marble headstone. A mural painted around the walls of the lounge bar in the Criterion Hotel in Gundagai depicts the scene. Yarri Park, a recreation area below the main street in Gundagai, commemorates his feat, and a sundial was erected in his honour by descendants of Fred Horsley, one of the people he saved.

In 2017 a Gundagai community committee, including members of the Wiradjuri community and descendants of those saved by Yarri and Jacky Jacky, erected a bronze sculpture in Sheridan Street, Gundagai entitled "The Great Rescue of 1852" in honour of the Wiradjuri heroes.

John Warner has composed a Song & Verse Cycle titled Yarri of Wiradjuri.

Notes

Citations

Sources

1810s births
1880 deaths
History of Australia (1851–1900)
Lifesaving
Wiradjuri people